Captive Hearts (aka Fate of a Hunter) is a 1987 romantic-drama movie co-produced between Canada, the U.S. and Japan starring Pat Morita, and co-written by Morita and John A. Kuri. It was directed by Paul Almond, filmed in Canada and released in the United States on June 5, 1987.

Plot
Shot down over 1944 wartime Japan in the depths of winter, an American airman and his Sergeant are captured by villagers but their lives are spared by the village elder, an ex-Colonel of the Japanese Army whose son was killed by an American bombing raid on a hospital where the son had been a doctor. The son had been married and his widow, Miyoko, still lives in the village.  The sergeant tries to escape but dies in the attempt.  The young airman, Robert, is protected by the headman, he is accepted by most of the villagers, he integrates into the village life and he and Miyoko fall in love, though a local man becomes jealous of their new romantic relationship and the romantic couple are then in danger because of their deep, blossoming romance.

The Japanese military are not far away, and the headman decides to help Robert escape.  His assistance leads to a tragic ending.

Cast

Filming locations
Canada
 Laurentian Mountains

References

External links
 
 
 

1987 films
English-language Canadian films
1987 romantic drama films
Films directed by Paul Almond
Metro-Goldwyn-Mayer films
Canadian romantic drama films
1980s Canadian films